The Treasure is a 1904 novel by the Swedish writer Selma Lagerlöf. Its original Swedish title is Herr Arnes penningar, which means "Mr. Arne's money". It has also been published in English as Herr Arne's Hoard. Set in Bohuslän in the 16th century, it tells the story of a group of Scottish mercenaries who escape from prison; they go on to murder a family to steal a treasure chest, after which one of them falls in love with the family's sole survivor.

Adaptations
The novel has been adapted for film three times: by Mauritz Stiller in 1919 as Sir Arne's Treasure, by Gustaf Molander in 1954 as Herr Arnes penningar, and as Poklad pana Arna in a 1967 Czechoslovak animated short film by Václav Bedřich.

See also
 1904 in literature
 Swedish literature

References

External links
 

1904 Swedish novels
Swedish novels adapted into films
Fiction set in the 16th century
Novels by Selma Lagerlöf
Albert Bonniers Förlag books
Swedish-language novels